Acrolophus persimplex is a moth of the family Acrolophidae. It was described by Harrison Gray Dyar Jr. in 1900. It is found in North America, including Arizona and Florida.

References

Moths described in 1900
persimplex